The following is an episode list for the TNT crime drama Saving Grace. It premiered on July 23, 2007, and ended on June 21, 2010, with a total of 46 episodes over the course of three seasons.

Series overview
{| class="wikitable" style="text-align:center"
|-
! style="padding: 0 8px;" colspan="2" rowspan="2"| Season
! style="padding: 0 8px;" rowspan="2"| Episodes
! colspan="2"| Originally aired
|-
! style="padding: 0 8px;"| First aired
! style="padding: 0 8px;"| Last aired
|-
 |style="background: #daa018;"|
 | 1
 | 13
 | style="padding:0 8px;"| 
 | style="padding:0 8px;"| 
 |-
 |style="background: #292421;"|
 | 2
 | 14
 | style="padding:0 8px"| 
 | style="padding:0 8px;"| 
 |-
 |style="background: #c3b49d;"|
 | 3
 | 19
 | style="padding:0 8px"| 
 |  style="padding:0 8px"| 
|}

Episodes

Season 1 (2007)

Season 2 (2008–09)

Season 3 (2009–10)

References

Saving Grace